This is a list of educational institutions located in Abeokuta, the capital of Ogun State in Nigeria, since its establishment in February 1976 from part of the former Western State.

A 
 Abeokuta Girls' Grammar School, Onikolobo
 Abeokuta Grammar School, Idi-aba
 Abeokuta North Local Government Nursery and Primary School, Imala
 Adeline Ogunlade Memorial Nursery and Primary School, Obantoko
 African Church Grammar School, Ita-Iyalode
 African Church Primary School I, Igbore
 Asero High School, Asero
 Aveeluz Private Nursery and Primary School, Ijeun-Titun, Kuto
 Anglican High School, Ibara

B 
 Baptist Boys' High School, Oke-Saje
 Baptist Girls' College, Idi-aba

C 
 Crescent University (CUAB), Lafenwa

D 
 Day Waterman College, Asu Village
 Deeper Life High School (DLHS), Odeda

E 
 Egba Comprehensive High School, Asero

F 
 Federal University of Agriculture (FUNAAB), Alabata
 Federal College of Education (FCEA), Osiele
 Foursquare International Secondary School, Asero

L 
 Lisabi Grammar School, Idi-aba

N 
 Nigerian Military School, Zaria
 Nigerian Navy Secondary School, Ibara
 Nobelhouse College, Oke-Mosan

O 
 Omolaja Sodipo Memorial Anglican School (OSMAS), Onikolobo

P 
 Premier Grammar School, Lafenwa
 Peace Foundation International Group of Schools (PFIGOS), Onikolobo
Prevailer Group of School, Bode Olude

S 
 Sacred Heart Catholic College, Ibara

T 
 Taidob College, Asero
 Trinity Comprehensive Schools, Ijaye

W 
 WaterLand Children's School, Abule Oloni

See also 

 List of schools in Nigeria
 List of schools in Ogun State

Abeokuta
 schools